The 1998–99 Scottish Cup was the 114th staging of Scotland's most prestigious football knockout competition, also known for sponsorship reasons as the Tennent's Scottish Cup. The Cup was won by Rangers who defeated Celtic in the final.

First round

Replays

Second round

Replays

Third round

Replays

Fourth round

Replays

Quarter-finals

Replay

Semi-finals

Final

References

Scottish Cup seasons
Scottish Cup, 1998-99
Scot